The 2022 Scottish Women's Premier League Cup was the 20th edition of the Scottish Women's Premier League's league cup competition, which began in 2002. It was sponsored by Sky Sports and officially known as the Sky Sports Scottish Women's Premier League Cup. The competition was contested by all 16 teams of the two divisions of the Scottish Women's Premier League (SWPL 1 and SWPL 2).

First round
The draw for the First round took place on Saturday, 25 August 2022 at Hampden Park.

Second round
The draw for the First round took place on Saturday, 20 September 2022 at Hampden Park.

Quarter-finals
The draw for the quarter-finals took place on Tuesday, 4 October 2022 at Hampden Park.

Semi-finals
The draw for the semi-finals took place on Tuesday, 25 October 2022 at Tynecastle Park Edinburgh.

Final
2022-23 Scottish Women's Premier League Cup Final
The venue for the final was announced on Tuesday, 25 October 2022

References

External links
Scottish Women's Premier League
Soccerwat SWPL Cup

2022 in Scottish women's sport
2023 in Scottish women's sport